Édouard François (born April 2, 1957 in Boulogne-Billancourt) is a French architect known for his environmentally friendly buildings. He was described as "The Hero of Green Architecture" by the Financial Times for his .

References

1957 births
Living people
People from Boulogne-Billancourt
20th-century French architects
21st-century French architects